The Bancroft treaties, also called the Bancroft conventions, were a series of agreements made in the late 19th and early 20th centuries between the United States and other countries. They  recognized the right of each party's nationals to become naturalized citizens of the other; and  defined circumstances in which naturalized persons were legally presumed to have abandoned their new citizenship and resumed their old one.

Origin

Named for historian and diplomat George Bancroft (1800–1891), who negotiated the first of these agreements with Prussia, the Bancroft treaties were mainly intended to prevent individuals from using naturalization as a way to avoid military service and other legal obligations in their native countries.

From 1868 to 1937, the United States entered into 25 Bancroft treaties covering 34 foreign countries. A typical Bancroft treaty had three major provisions.  The first specified the terms under which each party would recognize the naturalization of its citizens by the other.  (Five years' uninterrupted residence in the adopted country was the usual requirement.)  The second provided that naturalized citizens who returned to their native country could be prosecuted for crimes that they allegedly committed before they emigrated.  The third and most important provided that naturalized citizens who returned to their country of origin and stayed there for two continuous years would be presumed to have resumed their former nationality.  That would require them to meet any unfulfilled military service obligation in their native country and deny them the diplomatic protection of their adopted one.  Article III of the 1908 treaty with Portugal was typical:

Constitutional infirmity

Conceived in an era when the right of individuals to change their citizenship was not universally recognized, the Bancroft treaties represented an important step forward in securing recognition by foreign governments of the right of their nationals to become American citizens.<ref>For a description of the legal doctrine of "perpetual allegiance" of subjects to their sovereign and the role of the Bancroft treaties in hastening its decline, see 
[http://www.law.virginia.edu/html/alumni/uvalawyer/sp05/martin_lecture.htm David A. Martin, Dual Nationality: TR’s "Self-Evident Absurdity"''', Chair Lecture, October 27, 2004, University of Virginia School of Law.]</ref>  But American constitutional law eventually made the treaties obsolete.

In Schneider v. Rusk, 377 U.S. 163 (1964), the Supreme Court invalidated a section of the Immigration and Nationality Act of 1952 (the McCarran-Walter Act) that would strip naturalized Americans of their citizenship after three years' continuous residence in their country of origin; and in Afroyim v. Rusk, 387 U.S. 253 (1967), the Supreme Court, reviewing part of the Nationality Act of 1940, held that Congress has no power to strip anyone of their citizenship, whether it is acquired by birth or by naturalization.  These decisions strongly suggested that any future case of involuntary loss of citizenship under one of the Bancroft treaties probably would not survive a Supreme Court challenge.

Termination of the Bancroft treaties

Concluding that the Bancroft treaties were unenforceable, the administration of President Jimmy Carter, acting in consultation with the Senate Committee on Foreign Relations, gave notice in 1980 terminating the treaties  with 18 of the 21 countries with which they were still in force.  The exceptions were the treaties with Albania, Bulgaria and Czechoslovakia.  The treaty with Albania was terminated in 1991 when Albania and the United States re-established diplomatic relations at the end of the Cold War. The treaty with the Czech Republic and the Slovak Republic as successor states to the former Czechoslovakia was terminated by the United States in 1997.   In the last years of Barack Obama's Presidency the treaty with Bulgaria was terminated. 
Termination by country

 

See alsoReid v. CovertTrop v. Dulles''
 Multiple citizenship (Dual nationality)
 Naturalization
 Conscription
 Allegiance
 Expatriation

Notes

Notes and references

External links 

Treaties of the United States
History of immigration to the United States
Nationality treaties
United States nationality law